Emblemaria australis is a species of chaenopsid blenny known from around Brazil, in the southwestern Atlantic ocean. Females of this species can reach a maximum length of  SL.

References 

australis
Fish described in 2003
Taxa named by Claudia R. Rocha
Taxa named by Luiz A. Rocha
Fish of Brazil